James Plunkett Kelly, or James Plunkett (21 May 1920 – 28 May 2003), was an Irish writer. He was educated at Synge Street CBS.

Kelly grew up among the Dublin working class and they, along with the petty bourgeoisie and lower intelligentsia, make up the bulk of the dramatis personae of his oeuvre. His best-known works are the novel Strumpet City, set in Dublin in the years leading up to the lockout of 1913 and during the course of the strike, and the short stories in the collection The Trusting and the Maimed. His other works include a radio play on James Larkin, who figures prominently in his work.

During the 1960s, Plunkett worked as a producer at Telefís Éireann. He won two Jacob's Awards, in 1965 and 1969, for his TV productions. In 1971 he wrote and presented "Inis Fail - Isle of Destiny", his very personal appreciation of Ireland. It was the final episode of the BBC series "Bird's-Eye View", shot entirely from a helicopter, and the first co-production between the BBC and RTE.

He was a member of Aosdana.

A first year class, "1 Plunkett" at Synge Street CBS, is named in honour of James Plunkett.

Works

Radio plays
 Dublin Fusilier (March 1952),
 Mercy (June 1953),
 Homecoming (April 1954),
 Big Jim (1955),
 Farewell Harper (1956).

Novels
 Strumpet City (1969)
 Farewell Companions (1977)
 The Circus Animals (1990)

Places
  The Gems She Wore (1972)

Short Story Collections
 The Trusting and the Maimed (1955)
 Collected Short Stories
janey Mary

External links

 Obituary: James Plunkett
 Irish writers online – James Plunkett
 James Plunkett Award

1920 births
2003 deaths
Irish male dramatists and playwrights
Irish male short story writers
Writers from Dublin (city)
Jacob's Award winners
Aosdána members
Irish male novelists
20th-century Irish novelists
20th-century Irish male writers
20th-century Irish dramatists and playwrights
20th-century Irish short story writers
People educated at Synge Street CBS